David M. Pollack (born June 19, 1982) is a former professional American football linebacker who played in two seasons in the National Football League (NFL), having suffered a career-ending injury in the second game of his second season. He played college football for the University of Georgia, was a three-time All-American, and was recognized as the top college defensive player in the nation. Pollack had 36 sacks during his collegiate career, third most in NCAA history. He was a first-round pick in the 2005 NFL Draft, and played professionally for the NFL's Cincinnati Bengals.

Early years
Pollack was born in New Brunswick, New Jersey. He attended Shiloh High School in Snellville, Georgia, and was a star in football, basketball and wrestling. In football, as a senior, he was a Class 5A all-state selection and the Atlanta Touchdown Club named him the Defensive Lineman of the Year.

College career
Pollack attended the University of Georgia, where he played for coach Mark Richt's Georgia Bulldogs football team from 2001 to 2004 and was a roommate of future NFL quarterback David Greene.

For three consecutive seasons, he was recognized as a first-team All-Southeastern Conference (SEC) selection and a first-team All-American (2002, 2003, 2004)—twice as an NCAA consensus first-team honoree, having received the first-team selections of a majority of All-America selector organizations in 2002 and 2004. He is only the second player in Bulldogs team history to earn first-team All-American honors in three seasons, following Heisman Trophy-winner Herschel Walker. In addition to his All-American accolades, Pollack received the following:

 SEC Player of the Year Award (2002, 2004)
 SEC Defensive Player of the Year Award (2004)
 Chuck Bednarik Award (2004)
 Ted Hendricks Award (2003, 2004)
 Lombardi Award (2004)
 Lott Trophy (2004)

His signature play came during the second game of the 2002 season. Pollack batted down a pass from South Carolina quarterback Corey Jenkins in the South Carolina end zone and managed to catch the ball in the end zone before it hit the ground; Pollack was credited with a 0-yard interception return for a touchdown. Pollack finished his college career with 36 sacks, a Georgia career record, and ranks third in NCAA history.

He graduated from the University of Georgia with a bachelor's degree in history.

Professional career

NFL career and injury
In his rookie season of 2005, Pollack was a reserve until the Bengals' sixth game, when he became a starter at linebacker. He missed two games due to a sprained knee. However, he still ranked second on the team with 4.5 sacks on the season, and posted 22 tackles and six assists for a total of 28.

In his second NFL season, 2006, he started the Bengals' first game. On September 17, 2006, in game against in-state rival Cleveland Browns, Pollack suffered what was later determined to be a broken sixth cervical vertebrae on a first quarter tackle on running back Reuben Droughns. He reportedly suffered no paralysis, but was taken off the field on a stretcher and underwent surgery to fuse two vertebrae, and was required to wear a halo brace for three months. Pollack's injury was determined to be a possible career-ending one. However, on January 7, 2007, ESPN reported that Pollack would be able to resume his career as long as the rehabilitation process went as planned. On July 11, 2007, it was announced that Pollack would not play at all during the 2007 season as his recovery continued.

On April 22, 2008, Bengals head coach Marvin Lewis announced that Pollack was "not completely comfortable where he [was] medically" and that he would retire.

Career after football

Pollack's new company, FanBan, manufactures sports banners that feature sports photographs and college football team logos. FanBan events have raised $4,321 for the YMCA scholarships that help underprivileged kids participate in YMCA programs as of February 10, 2008.

On September 9, 2008, Pollack began a new career as an afternoon sports talk host on Atlanta's 790 The Zone. Also in 2008, Pollack began studio work for CBS's college football coverage. In 2009, Pollack joined ESPN as a college football analyst.

In fall 2011, he became part of ESPN's College GameDay and a host on the Palmer and Pollack show.

In summer 2012, it was announced that Pollack would join Rece Davis, Jesse Palmer, and Samantha Ponder on ESPN's Thursday Night Football, replacing Craig James.

In October 2013, he received harsh criticism for his public comments that women should not be allowed to serve on the College Football Playoff selection committee because they had not played the game.

On March 11, 2020, Pollack was announced as one of the newest members of the College Football Hall of Fame. He was announced live on air by his College Gameday colleague, Rece Davis.

Personal life
Pollack is a Christian. Pollack is married to Lindsey Pollack. They have one son and one daughter.

David and Lindsey Pollack created The Pollack Family Foundation, an organization with a vision of “… a nation of healthy families” and a mission to “… educate individuals, families and communities on the benefits of nutrition and exercise, and provide them opportunities to embrace healthy living through eating well and physical activity.“

References

External links

 

1984 births
Living people
People from Snellville, Georgia
Sportspeople from the Atlanta metropolitan area
Sportspeople from New Brunswick, New Jersey
Players of American football from Georgia (U.S. state)
American football linebackers
Georgia Bulldogs football players
All-American college football players
Cincinnati Bengals players
College football announcers
ESPN people